Breath of Fire III is a role-playing video game developed and published by Capcom originally for the PlayStation console as part of the Breath of Fire series. Initially released in Japan on September 11, 1997, the game was later released in North America and Europe in 1998. It is the first game in the franchise to feature three-dimensional graphics and voice acting. The title was developed by director Makoto Ikehara and features a unique jazz-inspired soundtrack by company composers Yoshino Aoki and Akari Kaida. On August 25, 2005, the game was ported and released for the PlayStation Portable handheld system in Japan, and was also released in Europe on February 3, 2006.

The story takes place in a fantasy world where humans live alongside anthropomorphic creatures, and centers the story on Ryu, the last of The Brood (a race of people who can transform into powerful dragons), as he searches the world to uncover the mystery of his people and reunite with his surrogate family. Ryu's journey takes him into adulthood where he is joined by a number of other characters who aid him in his quest. The game received mostly positive reviews upon release, and would go on to sell more than 679,000 copies in Japan and the United States.

On January 27, 2016, Capcom announced that Breath of Fire III would be re-released as a download in the US in February through the PlayStation Network for the PlayStation Vita, PSTV, and other PSP hardware compatible devices.

Gameplay

Breath of Fire III is a traditional console role-playing game that requires the player to accomplish story-based objectives while battling enemy creatures in a number of fantasy environments. Presented from an overhead isometric viewpoint, the player may rotate the game's camera in any direction around the central character, as well as tilt it up or down to see over or under impeding objects. When traveling through the game's environment, each character can perform a unique special ability that allows the player to solve puzzles or destroy objects, as well as gain access to otherwise hidden areas. The game uses three-dimensional graphics for scenery, buildings, and other objects, while still retaining two-dimensional sprites for characters.

The game introduces a number of new features to the series, including the Master System, which allows any of the game's playable characters to apprentice under specific non-player characters known as masters, which allows them to learn new skills and influence their statistics. An additional feature, the Fairy Village, gives the player the ability to influence the growth of a small town of faeries, which in turn gives them access to special items or in-game features such as mini-games and a sound test. While journeying on the world map, players may set up camp, which can replenish a character's health by resting, as well as allowing them to speak directly to any member of their party. Other series mainstays such as fishing return with a new, expanded interface and point allocation system that keeps track of what fish a player has caught and their size.

Battles in Breath of Fire III occur randomly when a player travels through hostile areas or dungeons during the course of the story. Using a turn-based strategy approach, the game allows a player to input commands at the start of each combat round, which are then carried out in accordance with each character's "agility" rating. A player may choose to attack, defend, cast magic spells, use items, change equipment, or flee from battle entirely. Players can combine chrysms of various attributes in order to let Ryu transform into different dragon forms. While previous Breath of Fire titles allowed groups of four characters to participate in combat, Breath of Fire III restricts the party limit to only three, yet offers a new "formation" system that allows for characters to be arranged in certain patterns for tactical benefits. Battles are won when all enemies are defeated, yielding experience points that go towards gaining characters' levels, which in turn leads to higher statistics and new skills.

Plot

Characters

The main characters in Breath of Fire III are Ryu (voiced by Tomoko Takai as a child and Kappei Yamaguchi as an adult) and his companions, a group of adventurers with their own distinct personalities and skills that help move the story forward. Ryu's story is presented in two parts, which involve him as both a child and adult, and his struggles to find his place in the world, as well as his lost friends. As a member of the ancient Brood race, he is a human with the ability to transform into powerful dragons, a power he doesn't fully understand at the beginning of the game, but begins to piece together as time goes on. He is accompanied on his quest by several other playable characters, including Nina (voiced by Kyoko Hikami), a winged princess from the Kingdom of Wyndia and powerful magician; Rei (voiced by Syusuke Sada), member of the cat-like Woren tribe and skilled thief; Teepo (voiced by Yoko Matsui), an orphaned rogue and longtime friend of Rei's with no memory of his past; Momo (voiced by Kaori Saito), daughter of a famous engineer and inventor who wields a SniperCannon; Garr (Garland in the Japanese version, voiced by Yukihiro Fujimoto), an experienced warrior and member of a group known as the Guardians who serve the goddess Myria; and Peco (Pecoros in the Japanese version, voiced by Ai Kamimura), a plant-like creature who resembles an onion with limited speech and a connection with nature.

The cast is rounded out by several supporting characters including Balio and Sunder, brothers and horse-men who act as mercenaries to a powerful crime lord and frequent adversaries of Ryu. Their boss, Mikba, is the head of a criminal organization with the ability to transform into a demon. Deis  returns as a powerful sorceress who knows the secrets of the past. Myria, an ancient Goddess of Destruction, serves as the central antagonist once more, though her motives have changed, and she is instead set on preserving the lives of humanity, whom she protects with an over-zealous matron complex, by ordering the death of the dragons centuries ago. Most of the master NPCs are removed from the plot, but Deis serves as one later on in the game.

Other masters in the game include the strong giant woodsman Bunyan whom Ryu, Teepo and Rei run afoul of shortly after the game begins, and Mygas, a traveling wizard who is camped outside of McNeil village who has run out of money.  The party will also meet the self-doubting master of non-lethal combat, Durandal, who in turn provides the party with the skills to impress Hondara, the benevolent Urkan priest who despises violence.  Fahl, the tipsy barkeep from Genmel and friend of Balio and Sunder will become one after those villains are defeated and if they have fought 30 battles without resting.  A strange fishman named Giotto teaches skills once the party reaches a high-enough fishing level. Once Ryu and his team fix Rhapala's lighthouse situation and meet the fairies, the errant fairy Meryleep will turn up at a secluded pond asking for her flower jewel which was stolen by a crow. The party can also use Peco to communicate with Yggdrasil trees, which serves as yet another master.  Near the end of the game, the dragon spirit Ladon will offer to communicate with Ryu in a similar fashion.

Story
The game begins in a chrysm mine in a far corner of the world, where a rare and powerful mineral is being harvested from the fossilized remains of dragons. When a large deposit is cracked open by dynamite, a preserved baby dragon emerges and is attacked by the frightened miners. The dragon defends itself, quickly killing everyone who rushes in to fight it. Eventually, the miners manage to ambush the dragon and, after knocking it unconscious, place it in a cage aboard a train to be taken away for experimentation. On the way out of the mine, the dragon jostles its cage off the train and falls down a hill on the outskirts of the Cedar Woods, where it transforms into a young blue-haired boy before again losing consciousness. The boy is discovered by a wandering thief named Rei, a member of the cat-like Woren clan and fellow orphan who believes himself to have discovered just another abandoned child, while hunting for food. Rei takes the boy to his home in the woods, where they meet Teepo, Rei's longtime friend and partner-in-crime, who agrees to let the boy join their thieving operation. Rei and Teepo learn that the boy's name is Ryu, the only fact he can remember. The team commits several minor crimes throughout Yraald Region but later cross a woodsman named Bunyan after being caught looting his cabin. They are given a task to slay the Nue in Mt. Glaus that is terrorizing the village of McNeil, and later come into favor with the local villagers after slaying the Nue . Upon defeating the Nue, the team discovered she was gathering food for her young, which she was unaware had already died. The villagers knew, and, afraid of the Nue taking revenge on the village for her youngs' death, tried to avert a massacre.

Shortly afterward, the trio are hired by a hooded figure named Loki to steal all the money heavily taxed upon the villagers from the town's corrupt mayor. The trio break into the manor and discover McNeil's ancestors haunt it. The defeat his spirits, pilfer the gold, and re-distribute his money among the villagers. The next morning, the trio The mayor, however, is secretly a member of a large crime syndicate. He hires two hitmen, the horse brothers Balio and Sunder, to exact revenge on the gang for their theft. Balio and Sunder proceed to burn down the trio's home in the woods, violently attack them, and leave them for dead.  Awakening a short while later, Ryu finds himself in the care of Bunyan who had fished him out of the river and found no trace of his friends. Believing them to be alive, Ryu leaves Yraald Region and travels to the city of Wyndia. Ryu comes across Balio and Sunder once again in Mt. Myrneg where he is stabbed, but this time, reanimates into a dragon. Upon seeing this, the horse brothers decide to take him to the Royal Family in Wyndia to sell him. Unfortunately, they present Ryu to them as he already transformed back to human. Balio and Sunder are locked up in the prison along with Ryu, where they meet Nina, child daughter of the King. Balio and Sunder trick Nina into releasing them and Ryu manages to break out of his cell.

Ryu manages to save Nina, but once again gets beaten by Balio and Sunder. Nina saves Ryu from death, and they flee the castle through the catacombs. Both Ryu and Nina are discovered once again by Balio and Sunder on Eygnock Rock where they are captured and transported to Genmel. Nina and Ryu managed to escape Balio and Sunder, who are now on their trail.

Ryu and Nina eventually come across a large tower and meet Momo, an inventor and engineer who is researching the properties of chrysm. Together with her diminutive robotic assistant Honey, the three eventually escape the tower by rocket when a group of bounty hunters arrive looking for them. Momo leads Ryu and Nina to a nearby chrysm research facility which is conducting experiments on plants. There, they are approached by the institute's chairman and colleague of Momo's late father, Dr. Palet, who informs the party of a mutant creature causing trouble at the dump where their biological waste is stored. After defeating the mutant plant creature, it gives up its offspring, whom Nina names Peco, to be cared for in its absence. As the four continue their journey east, they hop onto a cart to be smuggled back to Wyndia, unaware that Palet sold them out to Balio and Sunder. They are recaptured by Balio and Sunder and transported back to Genmel. They are then signed up to fight in the arena and it is there that the team meets Garr, a seasoned warrior and champion in the arena, who has a vast knowledge of people like Ryu who can turn into a dragon. Garr managed to beat Ryu in the arena, but demands Ryu as his prize, sidestepping his deal with the horse brothers. With Garr's help, the team defeats the horse brothers at Maekyss Gorge for good.

Garr agrees to help the group in finding Rei and Teepo, on the condition that Ryu also accompany him to a sacred temple far to the east. They return to Wyndia and bring Nina home safety, while requesting a passport in order to cross to bridge to Rhapala Region. Nina is ordered by her family to stay behind, but discovered Honey roaming around the castle. While chasing Honey, she discovered a teleportation device underneath the castle, which transported her and Honey outside the castle. Both Nina and Honey later reunite with the party and joined them on the journey to Rhapala Region.

After crossing a long bridge, they arrive in the port city of Rhapala and agree to help a guild worker named Beyd repair the lighthouse. The heroes manage to help him and soon travel through the heart of a volcano to Urkan Region, the group arrive at the temple of which Garr had spoken. Garr and Ryu journey inward alone. There, Garr reveals the true fate of the Brood, the race of dragons that once populated the world. He explained that the Brood was slaughtered by the hundreds by Garr and his fellow guardians at the behest of Myria, an ancient goddess who promised an age of peace in return. With Ryu being the last living dragon, Garr attempts to slay him, but Ryu beats him and escapes. Having been easily defeated by a child of the Brood, Garr has an epiphany: the Brood didn't really fight back against him and the other guardians and could have easily defeated them.

The story cuts to several years later, when reports of a rampaging dragon have led Garr to the same mines where Ryu was originally found. In the depths of the mine he finds Ryu, now a young adult. After convincing Ryu that means him no harm, Garr asks forgiveness for his actions against his people centuries ago. He also entreats Ryu to help him discover the true motivation behind Myria's genocide against the Brood. After leaving Dauna Mines, they come across a ferocious Weretiger on Ogre Road. Back in Yraald Region, the pair re-groups with Nina, now a young adult, too, who led a regiment in arresting Mayor McNeil in his involvement with the attempt on Ryu's life as well as the destruction of their home in the woods. They soon discover the Weretiger has moved through the village, and found that Loki was mauled. They track the weretiger to the Cedar Woods to make a shocking discovery that Rei is not only alive, but the beast they encountered, and battling Mikba, the leader of the crime organization responsible for the attack on his friends. Rei then tracks down Mikba to Checkpoint in Dauna Hills, and is severely wounded in the process. Once Rei joins their group, they learn that he has not seen Teepo since the incident, either.

While investigating some suspicious activity at the plant institute per Nina's orders, the team reunites with Momo, who has been performing experiments at the plant institute with Peco (who in the intervening years has been frequently visiting the great tree Yggdrasil, overseer of the world's forests) and discover Palet was conducting a grisly experiment in order to resurrect his dead mother. The party manages to stop Palet. They return to Wyndia Castle, and knowing that Ryu has a price on his head, Nina convinced Rei to obtain the passport. Rei was later made after a guard saw him with Ryu. The king ordered his arrest, but Rei and Nina managed to escape via the underground teleport. They soon make their way back to Rhapala Region. The party receives information about Myria's whereabout from a deity named Deis. After traversing the ocean to the forgotten northern continent, the group finds a town littered with advanced technology from a forgotten age, and then proceed to the last known village of the Brood, Dragnier, where they learn of the battle between the heroes from the first Breath of Fire and Myria millennia ago. They learn that the Goddess returned to seek her revenge against the Brood.  The party continues by crossing an expansive desert, beyond which they find the ruined city of Caer Xhan, a former haven of technology which contains an escalator leading to Myria's fortress.

After making their way up the long escalator to the floating Myria Station, the group fights its way into the facility's inner sanctum, where they meet a lavender-haired young man who reveals himself to be Teepo. After surviving the attack by Balio and Sunder by drawing on his latent dragon powers, Teepo was contacted by the Goddess, who convinced him to live in peaceful seclusion in her fortress to spare the world from his destructive power. Unable to convince Ryu or his friends to do the same, Teepo morphs into his Dragon Lord form and fights them, only to be defeated, his dying words revealing that he just wanted to be with his "family", Ryu and Rei.  The determined group makes their way to Myria herself within the station's control center, where she reveals that she exterminated the dragons centuries ago for the same reason she destroyed the world's advanced technology: to keep humanity from inadvertently destroying itself. She presents Ryu the same choice she gave Teepo: to live the rest of his life in peace within her station or be destroyed.

If the player opts to comply with Myria, the game ends anticlimactically, showing Ryu in Eden, and blacking out with the text, "And so time passes... unchanging..."  If instead the player chooses to challenge her, the spirit of the great tree Yggdrasil channels itself through Peco and tells Myria she is taking her power too far, and, like any parent, she must allow her children to make their own mistakes. With that, Ryu and his friends overcome Myria and then flee the station as it crumbles around them. Garr reveals that his life must end with Myria's, turning to stone while Ryu and Nina look on; Deis, now revealed to be Myria's sister, appears before Myria as the station falls apart, stating that they will henceforth leave the world in humanity's hands.  Ryu, Nina, Momo, Rei, and Peco, now having safely evacuated the station, make their way out of its rubble and back into the desert to begin their long journey home.

Development
Breath of Fire III was developed by members of Capcom's Development Studio 3, including director Makato Ikehara and producers Yoshinori Takenaka and Hironobu Takeshita. The game was the first in the series to feature three-dimensional environments, which were used in conjunction with hand-drawn character sprites designed by series artist Tatsuya Yoshikawa. Yoshikawa created multiple designs for many of the game's characters during production, with some in-game character sprites such as young Ryu and Teepo and adult Nina not matching their final promotional artwork. Before its release in Japan, Breath of Fire III was preceded by a promotional trailer that appeared on a demo disc of Resident Evil 2 that came bundled with the Japanese version of Resident Evil: Director's Cut. Capcom USA announced in August 1997 that the title would receive an English localization in North America, with the release date originally set for January 1998, which would eventually get pushed back to the following March. In Europe, the game was published through French publisher Infogrames (Instead of Capcom's main European partner Virgin Interactive) and was released in October 1998.
 
In June 2005, Capcom announced that it would be porting Breath of Fire III to the PlayStation Portable handheld system alongside a similar port of Mega Man Legends, with both to be released the following August. The port features a new title logo graphic, and was re-programmed to make use of the handheld's native 16:9 widescreen display. An expanded version of the title's fishing minigame is also included, which can be shared with another PlayStation Portable owner using the system's GameShare function, with the Japanese release including a full-color fishing guidebook as a bonus. An English version of the port was later made available exclusively in Europe in February 2006, which contained the same translation as the original PlayStation release.

On January 27, 2016, Capcom announced that Breath of Fire III would be re-released in February as a download through the PSN network for the PS Vita, PSTV, and other PSP hardware compatible devices. The release announcement applies only to the PlayStation Network's US store.

Audio
The music of Breath of Fire III was composed by Yoshino Aoki and Akari Kaida, two members of Capcom's internal sound team who also provided the vocals for the title's ending song "Pure Again". While previous games in the series used more traditional orchestral compositions, the soundtrack to Breath of Fire III features a unique jazz-inspired motif that focuses on instruments such as piano and xylophone. In September 1997, Capcom released the Breath of Fire III Original Soundtrack published by First Smile Entertainment, which features 31 select songs from the game across a single disc. A complete musical selection for the game would not be made available until March 2006, when the company released the Breath of Fire Original Soundtrack Special Box boxset containing music from the first five games in the series. Capcom had originally intended to use the theme song "Machi" (街, lit. City) by rock band Sophia for an opening animation that was to be included in the game but later discarded. The song would later appear in the game's television commercial in Japan, and would be released as a single in July 1997 by Toy's Factory.

In December 1997, Capcom's released the Breath of Fire III Drama Album, a radio drama which features re-enactments of scenes from the game performed by new and returning voice actors. Some characters, such as Momo, Garr, and Peco, are re-cast, now voiced by Kotono Mitsuishi, Akio Ōtsuka, and Yukiko Matsuura respectively, while Kappei Yamaguchi now performs as both child and adult Ryu, and Kyoko Hikami returns as the voice of Nina, who also sings the album's image song, "Harmonica". The album also includes new voiced roles such as Tomohiro Nishimura as Balio, Takehito Koyasu as Sunder, and Sayaka Narita and Omi Minami as Bambi and Bimbi, a team of reporters created especially for the album.

Reception

Breath of Fire III was met with a mostly positive response in Japan, with Famitsu Weekly awarding it 28 out of 40 possible points, while Dengeki PlayStation Magazine awarded it a 79% average. It was also met with a positive critical reception in Europe, with Computer and Video Games awarding it a full five-star rating, concluding that it is a "totally engrossing RPG" and "highly recommended."

Reviewing the Japanese release as an import, GamePro called it "a very enjoyable RPG in which sure craftsmanship is easily evident", giving praise to the colorful graphics and well-constructed battle system yet criticizing its soundtrack, remarking that it "veers widely from unmemorable electronica to hopeless schmaltz, and more often than not, it doesn't add to the atmosphere of the story." Reception for Breath of Fire III''' in North America was positive, with the game holding a GameRankings score of 74% based on 12 reviews, all of them from North American publications. GameSpot declared that despite taking the series into 3D gaming, it was still a very "standard" role-playing game, stating that "even with its handful of new features, Breath of Fire III breaks little new ground." IGN similarly declared that "[f]or an RPG, Breath of Fire presents nothing incredibly new, story-wise, however the way in which everything in the game is arranged and executed shows an incredible amount of attention to detail and depth," additionally giving praise to the game's "memorable characters" and "immersive" gameplay. Game Informer called it a "fairly straight-forward RPG" with colorful graphics and good characters, but found the long load times and high rate of enemy encounters to be a hindrance. PlayStation: The Official Magazine called the game a "must buy", calling attention to the game's "clever use of sound effects, detailed animation, and well-written, often humorous dialogue," adding that "to shrug this game off as 'more of the same' in the role-playing department would be a crime." The North American version would go on to sell 230,000 copies in its first year.Next Generation stated that "Breath of Fire III is more than matched against the new breed of visually flashy RPGs on the market."

PlayStation Portable
The re-release of Breath of Fire III for the PlayStation Portable was received similarly to the first in Japan, with Famitsu giving the game a marginally better score of 29 out of 40.

European reviewers of the game were mixed. Some, like Eurogamer, were critical of the game's aged presentation and gameplay, claiming that "with nine years of intervening genre development since its inception, this is no wunderkind," citing the port's long load times and slow gameplay to be its downfall. Others, such as Play Magazine, found it to be "pretty generic, as all RPGs never fail to be, but does it all expertly, providing a great adventure that will soak up some hours." Official UK PlayStation 2 Magazine'' called the game "archaic yet charming" and recommended it only as a window into the genre's past. The PlayStation Portable version held a score on GameRankings of 71% at the time of the site's 2019 closure.

Sales
The original PlayStation release sold 425,497 copies in Japan during 1997, making it the 24th most-bought game that year, as well as qualifying it for Sony's "PlayStation the Best" distinction, which allowed it to be re-released in December 2000 at a reduced price. The game sold a further 230,800 copies in the United States, adding up to a total of at least  units sold in Japan and the United States.

The PSP version sold 23,448 units in Japan, enough to qualify for a re-release under Capcom's "CapKore" label at a reduced price in January 2007. This adds up to a total of at least  copies sold for both the PlayStation and PSP platforms in Japan and the United States.

Notes

References

1997 video games
Breath of Fire
Infogrames games
Japanese role-playing video games
PlayStation (console) games
PlayStation Portable games
Video games developed in Japan
Video games about dragons
Video games about shapeshifting
Video games scored by Akari Kaida
Video games scored by Yoshino Aoki
Video games with isometric graphics